John Kasper (October 21, 1929 – April 7, 1998), born Frederick John Kasper, Jr., was a Ku Klux Klan member and segregationist who took a militant stand against racial integration during the civil rights movement.

Life

Educated at Columbia University, Kasper became a devotee of Ezra Pound and corresponded with the poet as a student. Between 1950 and 1963, Kasper sent 400 letters to Pound and received an unknown number of replies (Pound's letters to Kasper are lost). In the letters Kasper identifies with Pound and, within a short time of beginning the correspondence, he considered himself Pound's main disciple.

Directed by Pound, Kasper began a small press (Square Dollar Press) in 1951, to publish works Pound favored. In 1953, Kasper opened the Make It New bookshop in Greenwich Village, displaying Pound's letters in the shop window. Kasper campaigned against racial integration in the Southern United States, calling it a Jewish plot. In those activities and others, Kasper believed he was disseminating the poet's ideas. Pound's association with Kasper caused chagrin among those who were attempting to have Pound released from St. Elizabeths Hospital, where he was incarcerated on charges of treason.

After running the bookshop in Greenwich Village, Kasper moved to Washington, D.C., where he befriended Pound and set up a company to publish the poet's works, as well as those of others such as Charles Olson. Imbibing Pound's right-wing ideas, Kasper formed the Seaboard Citizens Council immediately after the ruling of the Supreme Court in the Brown v. Board of Education case, with the aim of preventing desegregation in Washington.

During the 1970s, Kasper returned to Merchantville, NJ where he had grown up. In this time, he worked as an accountant for a train company.  Also at this time, he fathered a child. His daughter, named Ruthanne Rose, was born in December 1978. After she was born, Kasper left the area.

Kasper was known to be in Florida and North Carolina for a time. He married a woman in 1992 and had another child in 1995 before his death in 1998.

Defence of segregation 
Kasper came to public attention during the integration of Clinton High School in Clinton, Tennessee. He sought to mobilize opponents of the desegregation order, and was arrested during the resulting unrest. Kasper was acquitted in his trial; the jury included members who served on the arresting auxiliary police force.

As a result of this incident, Kasper became a focal point at similar protests across the Southern United States, often an unwelcome one. While he was campaigning, Kasper was jailed for crimes ranging from inciting a riot to loitering. He was a suspect in a school bombing in Nashville as well as multiple synagogue bombings—he was a virulent antisemite—although no evidence was provided to link him directly to any of the cases.

In 1956, he was under a court order to desist, which he ignored, prompting his arrest and conviction for contempt of court. He was found guilty, appealed and lost. he was then sentenced to one year in jail. He served eight months for conspiracy in 1957.

Upon his release, he called for a return to Constitutionalism, and the creation of a third party to oppose the integration which he said was now supported by both the  Democrats and Republicans. He became associated with the National States' Rights Party and ran in the 1964 Presidential election with J.B. Stoner as his running mate. Kasper attracted negligible support: just 6,434 votes in just two states, Kentucky and Arkansas.

Kasper returned to his northern roots in 1967 and effectively left politics, settling down to family life and a series of clerical jobs. He died in April 1998 at the age of 68.

References

External links
John Kasper's FBI files obtained through the FOIA and hosted at the Internet Archive

FBI headquarters files part 1
FBI headquarters files part 1-1
FBI headquarters files part 2
FBI headquarters files part 2-2
FBI headquarters files part 3
FBI headquarters files part 3-3
FBI headquarters files part 4
FBI headquarters files part 4-4
FBI headquarters files part 5
FBI headquarters files part 6
FBI headquarters files part 7
FBI headquarters files part 8
FBI headquarters files part 9
FBI headquarters files part 10
FBI headquarters files part 11
FBI headquarters files part 12
FBI headquarters files part 13
FBI headquarters files part 14
FBI headquarters files part 15
FBI headquarters files part 16
FBI headquarters files part 17
FBI headquarters files EBF18
FBI headquarters files EBF49
FBI headquarters files EBF321
Knoxville office files part 1
Knoxville office files part 2
NYC office files part 1

1929 births
1998 deaths
20th-century American businesspeople
20th-century American politicians
20th-century far-right politicians in the United States
American booksellers
American prisoners and detainees
American publishers (people)
American segregationists
Candidates in the 1964 United States presidential election
Citizens' Councils
Columbia University alumni
American Ku Klux Klan members
National States' Rights Party politicians
People acquitted of crimes
People from Greenwich Village
Tennessee politicians convicted of crimes
Activists from New York City
Activists from Washington, D.C.